The 2018 Champions Indoor Football season was the fourth season of the CIF. The regular season began on March 3, when the Wichita Force traveled to Salina Liberty, losing 17–15. The regular season concluded on June 10. This was the second season in which four teams per conference advanced to the Champions Bowl playoffs, with the top seed in each conference hosting their conference's fourth seed, and second seeds hosting third seeds in the first round.

The league champion was the Duke City Gladiators over the Sioux City Bandits 31–27 in Champions Bowl IV. The regular season MVP was Sioux City Bandits running back Darrian Miller.

League changes
On August 16, 2017, the CIF announced the Quad City Steamwheelers as an expansion team for 2018. On August 30, the league announced the addition of the Sioux Falls Storm from the Indoor Football League (IFL). The Wichita Falls Nighthawks of the IFL also joined on September 12.

On the same day the Nighthawks joined, the Bloomington Edge and West Michigan Ironmen left the CIF for the IFL. The CIF apparently then attempted to sue the IFL, Edge, and Ironmen for leaving the CIF after the two teams had already signed league affiliation agreements with the CIF for 2018. The IFL then threatened to sue the CIF, Storm, and Nighthawks in return despite neither former IFL team signing an affiliation agreement with the IFL for 2018. To avoid disputes, the CIF stated they would not schedule either team. The Storm immediately announced that they would return to the IFL and the Nighthawks had to suspend operations.

While the CIF did drop the lawsuit against the IFL, it filed for an injunction against the Edge and Ironmen teams from participating in the IFL for breaking the terms of their signed affiliation agreements. A temporary injunction from participation against the two teams was granted on January 31, 2018. The Ironmen later announced a change in ownership,. were granted approval to return to the CIF for the  2019 season and were allowed to play the 2018 season in the semi-professional Midwest Professional Indoor Football (MPIF) during the 2018 season. The Edge then played an independent schedule after the conclusion of the 2018 CIF season to meet the terms of the injunction.

Prior to the season, Dallas Marshals were sold and moved to the Fair Park Coliseum due to arena lease issues in negotiations with the new Mesquite Arena owners. The Marshals played two regular season home games on March 3 and 10, however, they canceled their next two for March 24 and April 14 on the day of the games. After the April 14 postponed game, the CIF issued a statement that a decision concerning the team is pending. The Marshals played an away game at the Texas Revolution on April 21, and the Fair Park Coliseum listed all remaining Marshals' games as postponed. On April 27, the team suspended operations for the rest of the season.

Standings

z - clinched top overall seed
x - clinched conference title
y - clinched playoff berth

Playoffs

References

Champions Indoor Football seasons